Ibdis (‘Ibdis) was a Palestinian village in the Gaza Subdistrict, located  northeast of Gaza City. In 1945, Ibdis had a population of 540 and a land area of 4,593 dunams, of which 18 dunams were built-up areas.

History
Tombs, dating to the sixth and seventh century CE, and  Byzantine ceramics have been found here.

Ottoman  era
Under the Ottomans, in the 1596 tax records, Ibdis was a village in the nahiya of Gaza, part of the Sanjak of Gaza, with a population of 35 households, an estimated 193 people, all Muslims. The villagers paid a fixed tax rate of 33,3 % on various products, including wheat, barley, sesame, fruits, vineyards, beehives, and goats; a total of  8,100 akçe. Half of the revenue went to a waqf.

In 1838, it was noted as a village 'Abdis, located in the Gaza district.

Socin found from an official Ottoman village list from about 1870  that Ibdis had 12 houses and a population of 53, though the population count included  men, only. Hartmann  found that  Abdis  had 15  houses.

In 1882, the PEF's Survey of Western Palestine described it as a mid-sized village standing on open ground.

British  Mandate era
During the British Mandate period, its houses were built of adobe brick and separated by narrow alleys. Toward the end of the Mandate period, new homes were constructed along the two roads that linked it with Majdal and the Jaffa Road. However, because the number of drilled wells was limited, the residents relied largely on rainfall for their crops. Ibdis was well known in the Gaza region for its quality grains, including wheat, barley, and sorghum. In the later period, fruit trees were grown, including grapes, apricots, and oranges.

In the 1922 census of Palestine, conducted by the British Mandate authorities,  ‘Abdis   had a population of 319,  all Muslims, increasing in the 1931 census  to 425, still all Muslims, in  62 houses.

In the  1945 statistics  Ibdis had a population of 540, all Muslims,  with a total of 4,593  dunams of land, according to an official land and population survey.  Of this, 149 dunams were used for plantations and irrigable land, 4,307  for cereals, while 18  dunams were built-up land.

1948 War, aftermath
The daily Palestinian newspaper Filastin reported in mid-February 1948, that Israeli forces arrived at Ibdis in three large vehicles on the evening of February 17. They were engaged by the local militia and a clash ensued which went on for over an hour. until the attackers retreated to Negba. According to the account, none of the residents were injured.

On July 8, as the first truce of the 1948 Arab-Israeli War was about to end, Israel's Givati Brigade moved on the southern front to link up with Israeli forces in the Negev. Although, they did not succeed in this mission, they managed to capture numerous villages in the area, including Ibdis. The Third Battalion of the brigade attacked the village at night, resulting in a 'long battle" with two companies of the Egyptian Army stationed there. The Israelis "only finished cleaning the position by the hours of the morning", according to Haganah accounts. It is unclear whether the inhabitants of Ibdis were expelled at that time, but the Haganah claims military equipment was taken was from the Egyptians.

Egyptian forces tried to recapture the village on July 10, but failed after suffering "heavy losses" when combating Israeli forces stationed there. According to the Haganah, the second Israeli victory at Ibdis was a turning point in the Givati advance, since onwards the brigade's forces did not withdraw from a single position until the end of the war. There was another failed attempt to capture the village on July 12. Egyptian president Gamal Abdel Nasser, who was a junior officer on this front recalled "On the first day of the truce the enemy [Israeli forces] moved against the Arab village of 'Ibdis which interpenetrated our lines".

Following the war the area was incorporated into the State of Israel. Merkaz Shapira was established nearby in 1948 and cultivates some land near the village site, but was, by 1992, not on Ibdis lands.

See also
Depopulated Palestinian locations in Israel

References

Bibliography

 
 
 
 

 
  

Nasser, G.A. (1955/1973):  "Memoirs" in Journal of Palestine Studies 
“Nasser's Memoirs of the First Palestine War” in 2, no. 2 (Win. 73): 3-32, pdf-file, downloadable

External links
Welcome To 'Ibdis
Ibdis, Zochrot
Survey of Western Palestine, Map 16:   IAA, Wikimedia commons
'Ibdis from the Khalil Sakakini Cultural Center

Arab villages depopulated during the 1948 Arab–Israeli War
District of Gaza